The rivière des Rosiers (in English: River of Roses) is a tributary of the Nicolet River which flows on the south shore of the St. Lawrence River. The Rosiers River flows through the municipalities of Tingwick, Kingsey Falls, Warwick, Sainte-Élizabeth-de-Warwick and Saint-Albert-de-Warwick, in the Arthabaska Regional County Municipality (MRC), in the Centre-du-Québec region, in Quebec, in Canada.

Toponymy 

The toponym "rivière des Rosiers" was made official on December 5, 1968, at the Commission de toponymie du Québec.

Geography

Territory 
The "rivière des Rosiers" watershed affects six municipalities, namely (from upstream to downstream) Saint-Rémi-de-Tingwick, Tingwick, Kingsey Falls, Warwick, Sainte-Élizabeth-de-Warwick and Saint-Albert.

Course 
The downstream portion of the river (length of ) was channeled at the start of XXth.

Hydrology 
The basin includes  of wetlands.

Natural environment 
The main forest species are sugar maple (Acer saccharum) and red maple (Acer rubrum).

We find 12 species of fishes in the river. The main species are horned mullet (Semotilus atromaculatus), black sucker (Catostomus commersoni), belly-rotten (Pimephales notatus) and the Redfin Shiner (Luxilus cornutus).

There are 39 species of bird x from 16 distinct families along the banks of the river. There are among others some species of buntings, warblers, swallows, tyrants, vireos, thrushes, and some representatives of corvids, such as the Raven and the Blue Jay.

See also 

 List of rivers of Quebec

References

Further reading  
 
 

Arthabaska Regional County Municipality
Rivers of Centre-du-Québec